Tuttlingen is a Landkreis (district) in the south of Baden-Württemberg, Germany. Neighboring districts are (from north clockwise) Rottweil, Zollernalbkreis, Sigmaringen, Constance and Schwarzwald-Baar.

History
The district dates back to the Oberamt Tuttlingen, which was created in 1806. After several minor changes it was merged with the Oberamt Spaichingen and converted into the district in 1938. In 1973 it was enlarged by some municipalities from the dissolved districts Donaueschingen and Stockach.

Mining 
From an old 3.5 km mine in a Doggererzflöz in Weilheim is wood in the Tuttlinger Fruchtkasten .
Steel was produced in Tuttlingen by the Schwäbische Hüttenwerke in Ludwigshal. The furnace in Harras was closed in 1832. By building railways new calculations make the ironore of the area unprofitable. After the Franco-Prussian War mining was stopped.

Geography
The landscape of the district are the hills of the Swabian Alb, with the Danube as the main river.

Coat of arms
The coat of arms show a deer antler in the top part, the symbol of the state of Württemberg. The area of the district became part of Württemberg in the 14th century. The half wheel in the bottom is the symbol of the Lords of Hohenberg, representing an Austrian possession in the district.

Towns and municipalities

References

External links

Official website (German)

 
Freiburg (region)
Districts of Baden-Württemberg